Otholobium curtisiae is a small spreading shrub assigned to the Pea family. All green parts are covered in hairs and urn-like glands. It has many woody stems, small and somewhat succulent, dark green alternately set clover-like leaves and heads consisting of 3-9 white, pea-like flowers on very short peduncles in the axils of the leaves. This species is an endemic of the Overberg area in the Western Cape province of South Africa. It mostly flowers in August and September.

Taxonomy and naming 
A specimen of this species was first collected for science in 2010 by Ms. Odette Curtis. Charles Stirton and A. Muthama Muasya described it in 2013 and named it honor of Ms. Curtis. The name of the genus Otholobium is a combination of the Greek words ὠθέω (ōthéō) meaning to push and λοβός (lobos) meaning pod, which Stirton selected because its fruit seems to be pushed out of the calyx.

Description 
These stems are covered in brown bark that splits vertically and is covered with thickened, persistent scars of discarded stipules and old urn-shaped pustules. The young shoots are purplish green in colour and covered in both short and long, stiff hairs. Flowering shoots are clustered in the upper two axils of the new season's growth, set with dense white stiff hairs, and large urn-shaped pustules concentrated below the leaves. The stipules become smaller further up the shoot. The density of the glands is higher on the underside of the leaflets. The leaflets have a wedge-shaped base, an entire margin and a pointed tip as an extension of the midvein (or mucro) that is straight in adult leaves except for the first leaves of the season that have recurved mucros. Both leaflets on the side are somewhat sickle-shaped, longer than the one in the middle, and have a hairless surface except for few stiff hairs pressed against the surface along the margins.

As in most Faboideae, the corolla is zygomorph, forms a specialized structure and consists of 5 free white petals. On each side, an ear-shaped appendage reaches somewhat beyond the attachment to the claw, and the tip of the blade is pointy. The blade is sculptured with 30–55 irregularly parallel lamellae.

Differences with related species 
Otholobium curtisiae differs from O. pictum by its many spreading stems, the middle leaflet being shorter than the side leaflets, the straight extended vein (or mucro) at the tip of each leaflet, the obviously stalked inflorescences consisting of 6–9 flowers, the oblong bracts that subtend each triplet of flowers and the warty fruits. O. pictum on the other hand, is a shrub with leaflets of equal length, tipped by a recurved mucro, with dense spikes consisting of 20–30 triplets of flowers, each of which is subtended by a broadly ovate bract, producing pods without warts.

Ecology 
Otholobium curtisiae grows back from its underground rootstock after the above ground biomass is destroyed in one of the fires that occur in the fynbos every decade of two. On all 6 locations where O. curtisiae was known to be growing at the time of its naming, it was accompanied by Delospermum asperulum, Drosanthemum parviflorum (both Aizoaceae), Relhania garnotii (Asteraceae), Ficinia gordongrayae (Cyperaceae) and Pentaschistis eriostoma (Poaceae).

Distribution and conservation 
It is considered endangered because it is known from only six locations, none of which lies within a protected area. In the past locations may have been lost due to crop cultivation, nowadays a continuing decline is caused by overgrazing and too frequent firing. There are probably less than 300 mature plants left.

References

External links 
 more photos

Psoraleeae
Endemic flora of South Africa
Plants described in 2013